In photometry, luminous intensity is a measure of the wavelength-weighted power emitted by a light source in a particular direction per unit solid angle, based on the luminosity function, a standardized model of the sensitivity of the human eye. The SI unit of luminous intensity is the candela (cd), an SI base unit.

Measurement
Photometry deals with the measurement of visible light as perceived by human eyes. The human eye can only see light in the visible spectrum and has different sensitivities to light of different wavelengths within the spectrum. When adapted for bright conditions (photopic vision), the eye is most sensitive to yellow-green light at 555 nm. Light with the same radiant intensity at other wavelengths has a lower luminous intensity. The curve which measures the response of the human eye to light is a defined standard, known as the luminosity function. For instance, the measured responses of the eye to violet light varied by a factor of ten.

Relationship to other measures

Luminous intensity should not be confused with another photometric unit, luminous flux, which is the total perceived power emitted in all directions. Luminous intensity is the perceived power per unit solid angle. If a lamp has a 1 lumen bulb and the optics of the lamp are set up to focus the light evenly into a 1 steradian beam, then the beam would have a luminous intensity of 1 candela. If the optics were changed to concentrate the beam into 1/2 steradian then the source would have a luminous intensity of 2 candela. The resulting beam is narrower and brighter, though its luminous flux remains unchanged.

Luminous intensity is also not the same as the radiant intensity, the corresponding objective physical quantity used in the measurement science of radiometry.

Units
Like other SI base units, the candela has an operational definition—it is defined by the description of a physical process that will produce one candela of luminous intensity. By definition, if one constructs a light source that emits monochromatic green light with a frequency of 540 THz, and that has a radiant intensity of 1/683 watts per steradian in a given direction, that light source will emit one candela in the specified direction.

The frequency of light used in the definition corresponds to a wavelength in a vacuum of 555 nm, which is near the peak of the eye's response to light. If the 1 candela source emitted uniformly in all directions, the total radiant flux would be about 18.40 mW, since there are 4π steradians in a sphere.  Note that a typical modern candle produces very roughly one candela while releasing heat at roughly 80 W.

Prior to the definition of the candela, a variety of units for luminous intensity were used in various countries. These were typically based on the brightness of the flame from a "standard candle" of defined composition, or the brightness of an incandescent filament of specific design. One of the best-known of these standards was the English standard: candlepower. One candlepower was the light produced by a pure spermaceti candle weighing one sixth of a pound and burning at a rate of 120 grains per hour. Germany, Austria, and Scandinavia used the Hefnerkerze, a unit based on the output of a Hefner lamp. In 1881, Jules Violle proposed the Violle as a unit of luminous intensity, and it was notable as the first unit of light intensity that did not depend on the properties of a particular lamp. All of these units were superseded by the definition of the candela.

Usage

The luminous intensity for monochromatic light of a particular wavelength λ is given by

where
Iv is the luminous intensity in candelas (cd),
Ie is the radiant intensity in watts per steradian  (W/sr),
 is the standard luminosity function.

If more than one wavelength is present (as is usually the case), one must sum or integrate over the spectrum of wavelengths present to get the luminous intensity:

See also
 Brightness
 International System of Quantities
 Radiance

References

Curve data

Scalar physical quantities
SI base quantities
Photometry